De Schippers van de Kameleon (2003) is a Dutch family film with main characters identical twins Koen van der Donk (Hielke Klinkhamer) and Jos van der Donk (Sietse Klinkhamer). The actors are also identical twins, born March 6, 1988. The film is based on the books of  about the adventures of the twins with their boat, the opduwer De Kameleon.

The film received a Golden Film (100,000 visitors) and a Platinum Film (400,000 visitors) and with 750.000 viewers in cinemas. It was the best viewed Dutch film production in 2003. In 2006 it was chosen as "Best Children's Movie" at the 4th International Film Festival in Eilat, Israel.
   
The film also has a sequel, Kameleon 2, with the same characters and actors. In 2021, it was followed by a second sequel De Kameleon aan de ketting.

References

External links
Official website 

2003 films
2000s Dutch-language films
2000s adventure films
Films based on Dutch novels
Seafaring films
Dutch children's films